The Punjabi Bagh West Metro Station is located on the Pink Line and Green Line of the Delhi Metro. It was opened on 14 March 2018.

The station

Station layout

Facilities

Entry/Exit

Connections

In late October 2019, it was decided to construct steel platforms on the viaduct of Green Line between Punjabi Bagh and Shivaji Park stations that will provide a seamless interchange between Green Line and Pink Line. Construction began that year itself and the new halt platform of Green Line, named Punjabi Bagh West, was thrown open to the public on 29 March 2022, after multiple delays.

The new halt platform of Green Line is connected by a Foot Over Bridge (FOB), which links with the Punjabi Bagh West station of the Pink Line. The FOB is 212 metres long. The new platforms are 155 metres in length and are connected with the FOB by two extra-large lifts on each platform with a capacity of 26 passengers each as well as staircases.

Bus
Delhi Transport Corporation bus routes number 85 EXT, 114+990, 159, 160, 442, 448A, 448B, 479, 568, 568A, 569, 804A, 808, 849, 861A, 889, 891, 908, 91O, 912, 915, 927EXT, 927STL, 928, 931, 934, 935, 940, 940A, 941, 943, 944, 953, 962, 962A, 962EXTCL, 962STL, 970, 970A, 970B, 970C, 975, 980, 984A, 985, 990, 990A, 990B, 990CL, 990ECL, 990EXT, 991, 997, AC-479, TMS (-), TMS-Lajpat Nagar, TMS-PBagh serves the station from nearby East Punjabi Bagh bus stop.

See also

Delhi
List of Delhi Metro stations
Transport in Delhi
Delhi Metro Rail Corporation
Delhi Suburban Railway
Inner Ring Road, Delhi
Delhi Monorail
Punjabi Bagh
Delhi Transport Corporation
West Delhi
New Delhi
National Capital Region (India)
List of rapid transit systems
List of metro systems

References

External links

 Delhi Metro Rail Corporation Ltd. (Official site) 
 Delhi Metro Annual Reports
 
 UrbanRail.Net – descriptions of all metro systems in the world, each with a schematic map showing all stations.

Delhi Metro stations
Railway stations in India opened in 2018
Railway stations in West Delhi district